The Longhai railway, formerly romanized as the  is a major arterial east–west railway in China. The line is named after Gansu, also known as Long in Chinese and Lianyungang's previous name, Haizhou. The Longhai Line is one of the busiest Chinese railways. It has dual tracks throughout and electrification was completed in 2009.

History
The Longhai railway was built over the course of half a century by four different governments of China: the Qing dynasty, Beiyang Government, Nationalist Government and the People's Republic.

The first section of the railway, entirely within Henan, from Kaifeng to Luoyang was built from 1905 to 1909 by a venture between the Qing dynasty and a Belgian joint-stock company backed by France and Russia. This line, known as the Bianliang–Luoyang railway, began operation on January 1, 1910.

The line was extended eastward to Xuzhou in 1916 and to Haizhou in 1923 with Dutch financing. In the west, the line was extended to Lingbao, Henan, in 1927 with Belgian financing. After the Northern Expedition, the Nanjing-based Republican government took control of construction and extended the line further west to Tongguan, Shaanxi, in 1931; Xi'an in 1934; Baoji, Shaanxi, in 1936; and Tianshui, Gansu, in 1945.

The railway was the centerpiece of Japanese operations in Henan during the Second Sino-Japanese War, with the Imperial Japanese Army repeatedly attempting to seize the railway in 1938 in the Battle of Northern and Eastern Henan and later during Operation Ichi-go.

Construction of the Tianshui to Lanzhou section, entirely within Gansu, broke ground in May 1946 but was halted by Chinese Civil War, then resumed under the People's Republic in April 1950 and was completed in July 1953. At this time, the entire Longhai railway entered into operation.

In the late 1950s through early 1960s, new railways were built from Lanzhou to the west: the Lanxin railway to Xinjiang (later connected to Kazakhstan) and the Lanqing railway to Qinghai (later extended to Tibet).

From 1956 to 1970, the section between Zhengzhou, Henan, and Baoji, Shaanxi, was upgraded to the dual-track line. During the same time, in Henan the line near Sanmenxia was re-routed due to the Sanmenxia Reservoir Project. The Zhengzhou to Shangqiu section was converted to dual-track in 1980.

The railway is a central section in the New Eurasian Land Bridge.

Cities and rail junctions along route
Jiangsu
 Lianyungang
 Xinyi: Jiaozhou–Xinyi railway, Xinyi–Changxing railway
 Xuzhou: Beijing-Shanghai railway
Anhui
 Dangshan
Henan
 Shangqiu: Beijing–Kowloon railway
 Kaifeng
 Zhengzhou: Beijing–Guangzhou railway
 Luoyang: Jiaozuo–Liuzhou railway
 Sanmenxia
Shaanxi
 Tongguan: Datong–Puzhou railway
 Mengyuan
 Weinan
 Xi'an: Nanjing–Xian railway, Houma–Xian railway, Xi'an–Ankang railway
 Xianyang: Xianyang–Tongchuan railway
 Baoji: Baoji–Chengdu railway
Gansu
 Tianshui
 Dingxi
 Lanzhou: Lanzhou–Xinjiang railway, Lanzhou–Qinghai railway, Baotou–Lanzhou railway

High-speed rail line parallel to the Longhai
The Xuzhou–Lanzhou high-speed railway, a high-speed rail line, has been built parallel to the Longhai line. The Zhengzhou–Xi'an section opened in February 2010. The last section of the corridor, the Baoji–Lanzhou high-speed railway was completed on 9 July 2017.

The corridor was extended with the opening in February 2021 of the Lianyungang–Xuzhou high-speed railway, which runs parallel to the Longhai line between Xuzhou and Lianyungang.

Gallery

See also

Rail transport in the People's Republic of China
List of railways in China

References

Railway lines in China
Rail transport in Jiangsu
Rail transport in Anhui
Rail transport in Henan
Rail transport in Shaanxi
Rail transport in Gansu
Railway lines opened in 1910